Four Bears Bridge is one of two bridges built over the Missouri River on the Fort Berthold Reservation in the U.S. state of  North Dakota. It carries North Dakota Highway 23. The current bridge which opened in 2005 is the second largest bridge in the state and replaced an earlier bridge built in 1934. The 1934 bridge was moved in 1955 following the construction of the Garrison Dam and the creation of Lake Sakakawea.

One worker was killed and three were injured when a portion of the new bridge collapsed during construction on November 30, 2004.

The current bridge is decorated with medallions reflecting the heritage of the Three Affiliated Tribes, the Mandan, Arikara and Hidatsa who inhabit the reservation. The bridge is named for two chiefs, one Mandan and one Hidatsa and both named Four Bears.

The bridge opened to traffic on September 2, 2005, at around 10:00 a.m. local time . An official opening ceremony was held on October 3, 2005.

References

Road bridges in North Dakota
Bridges completed in 1955
Bridges completed in 2005
Bridge disasters caused by construction error
Bridge disasters in the United States
Transportation disasters in North Dakota
2005 establishments in North Dakota
Construction accidents in the United States
1955 establishments in North Dakota
Mandan, Hidatsa, and Arikara Nation